Joseph Foxcroft Cole (1837–1892) was an American landscape artist of the Barbizon style of landscape painting.

Life and career

Cole and fellow apprentice Winslow Homer studied in Boston, before Cole moved to France to study with Émile Lambinet and Charles Jacque. Cole exhibited in Paris at the 1866-67 and 1873-75 Salons, and the Exposition Universelle (1867).

References

External links
http://www.artnet.com/artists/joseph-foxcroft-cole/
https://americanart.si.edu/artist/joseph-foxcroft-cole-939
https://www.nga.gov/collection/artist-info.33302.html

1837 births
1892 deaths
19th-century American painters
20th-century American painters
American male painters
Landscape painters
19th-century American male artists
20th-century American male artists